The 1916 Tasmanian state election was held on Thursday, 23 March 1916 in the Australian state of Tasmania to elect 30 members of the Tasmanian House of Assembly. The election used the Hare-Clark proportional representation system — six members were elected from each of five electorates.

Although the Liberals had won the 1913 election, a subsequent by-election had seen both parties holding 15 seats in the House of Assembly and Solomon losing government to Labor's John Earle. Earle's government had been appointed on the expectation that Earle would quickly call for a dissolution of the House of Assembly, which he refused to do, and successfully appealed to the Colonial Office.

At the election, Earle was the incumbent Premier of Tasmania and the Liberal Party was headed by Walter Lee. The Labor Party made no gains at the 1916 election. Joshua Whitsitt won as an Independent. The Liberals had no clear majority, winning 15 seats. Lee became Premier, as leader of the party with the most seats.

Results

|}

Distribution of votes

Primary vote by division

Distribution of seats

See also
 Members of the Tasmanian House of Assembly, 1916–1919
 Candidates of the 1916 Tasmanian state election

References

External links
Assembly Election Results, 1916, Parliament of Tasmania.
Report on General Election, 1916, Tasmanian Electoral Commission, September 1916.

Elections in Tasmania
1916 elections in Australia
1910s in Tasmania
March 1916 events